"Pilot" is the first episode of the American television sitcom Arrested Development. It originally aired on the Fox network in the United States on November 2, 2003. In the episode, George Sr. is about to announce his retirement when he is arrested for using his company's funds for personal expenses. It was written by series creator and executive producer Mitchell Hurwitz and was directed by Anthony and Joe Russo. An uncensored, extended version of the episode was released as a special feature on the DVD home release.

Plot
For ten years, Michael Bluth had been waiting for his father, George Sr., to make him a partner in their family company. On the morning of his father's retirement boat party, Michael discusses the announcement of his promotion with his son, George Michael. The two of them are living in one of the Bluths' model homes, to show their support for the business. After dropping his son off at the frozen banana stand his father started, Michael goes to see his oldest brother Gob (an amateur magician), to ask for his check to cover party expenses. Gob tells Michael that their sister Lindsay had been staying at the Four Seasons for a month. Upset by both Lindsay's avoidance of him and her abuse of the company's largesse, Michael goes to tell his mother, Lucille, that the company checkbook is closing.

At the banana stand, George Michael's cousin Maeby plays a prank on him, taking advantage of the fact that he does not recognize her. The kids discuss how they never see each other, and Maeby suggests they kiss at the boat party to teach their parents that the cousins need to see each other more often. Back at the hotel, Lindsay's husband Tobias, believing that the boat party is pirate-themed because of a joke from Michael, begins trying on Lindsay's blouses. He mistakes a group of garishly dressed men for pirates, and boards a van full of homosexual protesters. Finally, George Sr. gives his retirement speech, and appoints the new CEO: his wife Lucille. The dismayed Michael decides it is time to move on. The family poses for a photo; Maeby goes through with her previous suggestion and kisses George Michael as the SEC raids the ship. George Sr. calls his secretary with instructions on what to do. Lindsay takes command of the boat and Lucille tells Buster, her youngest son, to find a channel to the ocean on the maps. Buster, despite his cartography lessons, can only offer certainty that the blue part of the map is land before a panic attack sets in. The SEC hauls George Bluth away, leaving the family in turmoil.

At the police station, Tobias joins up with the family and tells them he discovered that the men on the other boat with him were in fact actors from the local theater. Believing that a path has been shown to him, Tobias informs the family that he has decided to become an actor. Michael then informs the family that their dad is being kept in jail, and the SEC is putting a halt on the company's expense account. Lucille decides to put Buster in charge. This is too much for Michael, who accepts a job in Arizona with a rival development company. When Buster discovers his academic pursuits didn't prepare him for running a big company, the family turns to Michael, begging for his help. Michael rejects their imposition, but Lindsay says he should visit their father before leaving. Michael does indeed visit his father in jail, asking why he wasn't put in charge. George informs him that he put Lucille in charge because he believes they cannot arrest a husband and wife for the same crime. Michael tells him that is not true, and George curses the advice of his attorneys. At the model home, Lindsay is trying to steal some belongings that she can grab and sell when she comes across George Michael. He opens up his heart, saying he wishes the family could see each other more often, and when Michael sees this, he decides to stay in California and try to save the family business.

On the next Arrested Development...
Having to share a room with his cousin Maeby, George Michael begins to feel awkward. Gob interviews for a job with the rival development company Michael interviewed for earlier, and at the county jail, George Sr. tells Michael that he's "having the time of [his] life."

Development
Discussion that led to the creation of the series began in the summer of 2002. Ron Howard had the original idea to create a comedy in the style of hand-held cameras and reality television, but with an elaborate, highly comical script resulting from repeated rewritings and rehearsals. Howard met with David Nevins, the President of Imagine Television, Katie O'Connell, a senior vice president, and two writers, including Mitchell Hurwitz. In light of recent corporate accounting scandals, such as Enron and Adelphia, Hurwitz suggested a story about a "riches to rags" family. Howard and Imagine were immediately interested in using this idea, and signed Hurwitz on to write the show. The idea was pitched and sold in the fall of 2002. Over the next few months, Hurwitz developed the characters and plot to the series. The pilot script was submitted in January 2003, and filmed in March 2003. It was submitted in late April, and added to the Fox fall schedule in May.

Tony Hale, who plays Buster, recalled that "we didn't really improv that much, because we knew [Mitchell Hurwitz] had a specific way he wanted it done".

Casting
The most difficult part for casting the series involved finding people who would be believable as a family. Alia Shawkat was the first person cast. Michael Cera, Tony Hale, and Jessica Walter were cast from video tapes and flown in to audition for Fox. Jason Bateman and Portia de Rossi both read and auditioned for the network and were immediately chosen. The character of Gob was the most challenging to cast. When Will Arnett auditioned, he depicted the character with a "macho" streak different from expectations; he was chosen immediately. The characters of Tobias and George Sr. were originally going to have minor roles, but David Cross's and Jeffrey Tambor's portrayals mixed well with the rest of the characters, and they were given more significant parts. Ron Howard, the executive producer, provided the narration for the initial pilot but meshed so well with the tone of the program that the decision was made to stick with his voice. Howard also aided in the casting of "Lucille 2"; the producers told him that their dream actress for the role would be Liza Minnelli but assumed nobody of her stature would take the part. However, she agreed when Ron Howard asked her himself, because they were old friends; she had been his babysitter when he was a child and she was a teen.

Reception

Critical reception
The New York Times critic Alessandra Stanley said that comparisons to The Royal Tenenbaums were unfair, noting that Arrested Development dropped the "highbrow precociousness" of that film. She praised the "dry, deadpan tone" and "offbeat satire", saying that the "humor lies in balancing the characters' loopiness with sly, satisfying digs at the rich." Tim Goodman praised the "film quality" and "comic beauty" of the series, while lauding Bateman's performance as "stunningly great". Goodman also said the series was too funny to survive, comparing it to the recently cancelled series Andy Richter Controls The Universe. Matt Roush of TV Guide said that the Pilot demonstrated it was "sophisticated and invigorating in its barbed wit and freewheeling blackouts and flashbacks" and praised the lack of a laugh track. Robert Bianco of USA Today wrote a largely positive review, exalting the performances of the entire ensemble cast, but called Bateman the standout. He, did, however, feel the series went too far outside the norm with the cousin storyline between George-Michael and Maeby, referring to it as "alarming". The A.V. Club writer Noel Murray wrote that the series premiere used its time well, saying that "between the on-screen titles, the narration, the quick insert shots, the brief flashbacks, and the rapid-fire dialogue, creator Mitchell Hurwitz and his team of writers, directors, and editors impart massive amounts of information in a short span of time."

Accolades
The pilot was honored at the 56th Annual Primetime Emmy Awards. Mitchell Hurwitz won Outstanding Writing for a Comedy Series for writing the pilot episode. During his acceptance speech, Hurwitz joked, "This is such a huge honor and, I fear, a giant mistake." Joe and Anthony Russo also won Outstanding Directing for a Comedy Series for their directorial work on this episode.

References

External links
 

Arrested Development episodes
Arrested Development
2003 American television episodes
Emmy Award-winning episodes